Alfa Romeo built/designed a range of aircraft engines based on the Bristol Jupiter and Bristol Pegasus designs, designated Alfa 125,  Alfa 126, Alfa 127, Alfa 128,  Alfa 129  and  Alfa 131. All these essentially similar engines were mainly fitted to Italian bombers in World War II, Alfa Romeo building around 11,000 units between 1934 and 1944

Design and development
Alfa Romeo adapted the Jupiter / Pegasus (which are very closely related) to metric measurements, local materials and indigenous equipment.

Variants

(The Italian engine designation system includes a suffix indicating major components or attributes. The most common were R for Riduttore - reduction gear and C for Compressore - compressor/supercharger, followed by a number indicating the rated altitude in hundreds of metres, two speed superchargers were indicated by a double figure such as 10/34).
Alfa Romeo Jupiter 

The standard  Jupiter engine built under licence from the Bristol Aeroplane Company.

Alfa 125 R.C.10 rated at 

Alfa 125 R.C.35 1934  rated at 

Alfa 126 R.C.10 1935 Civilian version of 126 R.C.34  rated at 

Alfa 126 R.C.32 rated at 

Alfa 126 R.C.34 1935  rated at 

Alfa 127 R.C.50 rated at 

Alfa 127 R.C.55 1937  rated at 

Alfa 128 R.C.18  rated at 

Alfa 128 R.C.21 1938  rated at 

Alfa 129 R.C.32 rated at 

Applications
Breda Ba.64  (Alfa125 R.C.35)
CANT Z.506A Airone  (Alfa 126 R.C.10)
CANT Z.506B Airone  (Alfa 126 R.C.34 / Alfa 127 R.C.50 / Alfa 127 R.C.55)
CANT Z.506C Airone  (Alfa 126 R.C.10)
Caproni Bergamaschi AP.1  (Alfa126 R.C.34)
Caproni Ca.97 (AlfaJupiter)
DAR-10A (prototype)  (Alfa126 R.C.34)
Fiat G.12  (Alfa 128 R.C.18)
Junkers Ju 52  (Alfa126 R.C.34)
Macchi M.C.94  (Alfa 126 R.C.10)
Macchi M.C.100  (Alfa 126 R.C.10)
Savoia-Marchetti S.73  (Alfa 126 R.C.10 / Alfa 126 R.C.34)
Savoia-Marchetti S.74  (Alfa126 R.C.34)
Savoia-Marchetti SM.75 Marsupiale  (Alfa 128 R.C.18 / Alfa 128 R.C.21)
Savoia-Marchetti S.77  (Alfa 126 R.C.10)
Savoia-Marchetti S.M.79 Sparviero  (Alfa 128 R.C.18 / Alfa 125 R.C.35 / Alfa126 R.C.34)
Savoia-Marchetti S.M.79-II Sparviero  (Alfa 126 R.C.34)
Savoia-Marchetti S.M.79B Sparviero  (Alfa 128 R.C.18)
Savoia-Marchetti S.M.81 Pipistrello  (Alfa 125 R.C.35 / Alfa 126 R.C.34)
Savoia-Marchetti S.M.82 Canguru  (Alfa 128 R.C.18 / Alfa 128 R.C.21 / Alfa 129 R.C.32)
Savoia-Marchetti S.M.83  (Alfa126 R.C.34)
Savoia-Marchetti S.M.84  (Alfa 128 R.C.21)
Savoia-Marchetti S.M.95  (Alfa 128 R.C.18 / Alfa 131 R.C.14/50)

Specifications (Alfa 128 R.C.21)

See also

References
Notes

Bibliography

Archivio Storico Alfa Romeo - Volume II. Torino, November 1998

1930s aircraft piston engines
Aircraft air-cooled radial piston engines
125